Pavlo Andriyovych Andreiev (born 1 January 1944) is a Soviet long-distance runner. He competed in the men's 10,000 metres at the 1972 Summer Olympics.

References

External links

1944 births
Living people
Athletes (track and field) at the 1972 Summer Olympics
Soviet male long-distance runners
Olympic athletes of the Soviet Union